Audes (Occitan, Auda) is a commune in the Allier department in central France.

Population

The inhabitants of the town of Audes are Audois.

Politics

Mayors of the commune of Audes:
 2008–2020: Serge Boulade
 2020–current: Michel Cheymol

See also
Communes of the Allier department

References

Communes of Allier